The Republic of Vietnam Wound Medal was a military decoration of South Vietnam first created in 1953. The medal was the South Vietnamese equivalent of the United States military's Purple Heart, and was awarded to any personnel of the South Vietnamese military who, while engaged in armed combat with enemies of the Republic of Vietnam, were either wounded or killed in action.

During the Vietnam War, the Wound Medal was often issued to Army of the Republic of Vietnam (ARVN) personnel for combat wounds received fighting the forces of North Vietnam or the Vietcong. The medal was seldom bestowed upon members of allied militaries such as the United States military and then only if the allied soldier in question was attached and under the direct command of a South Vietnamese unit. For service members of the United States military, the Wound Medal is not authorized for wear on a military uniform.

With the fall of South Vietnam in 1975, the Wound Medal became obsolete.

See also
Military awards and decorations of South Vietnam

References

Military awards and decorations of Vietnam
Wound decorations